Ingrid Vanderveldt (born November 7, 1970) is an American businesswoman, media personality, and investor. She was the first Entrepreneur-in-Residence for Dell and is the founder and current CEO of the Empowering a Billion Women by 2020 movement. Vanderveldt was the creator and manager of the Dell $100 million credit fund, and a member of the 2013 United Nations' Global Entrepreneurship Council.

Early life, education 
Vanderveldt was born in Bethesda, Maryland, the daughter of Dr. Hendrikus Hermanus Johannes Vanderveldt (Ph.D. Mechanical Engineering) and Joan Vanderveldt (M, Psychology).  She is one of four children including Dr. Hendrikus Vanderveldt, a GI physician, Dr. Garig Vanderveldt, an ER physician, and Erin Vanderveldt, an entrepreneur.  Her parents met at Catholic University of America and with a strong religious upbringing as a child, Ingrid originally thought she would be a missionary.  As she grew up around her father’s entrepreneurial and technical work, she went on to earn two Masters and began launching a variety of ventures, all with technology at their core.

She earned her Masters in Architecture at The Savannah College of Art & Design in 1993 and an MBA from The University of Texas at Austin in 1996.

Career 
Vanderveldt founded a number of companies and ventures including creating and hosting CNBC’s first original primetime series, “American Made,” founding Ingrid Vanderveldt LLC, and acting as CEO of VH2 Energy Investments & Green Girl Energy. Vanderveldt is the 2018 Recipient of the Global Empowerment Award by the Global Business and Interfaith Peace Awards in partnership with the UN, has been named by Oprah as one of her Global 100 Leaders, and is the winner of the FORBES & Northwestern Mutual "Global Entrepreneur in Excellence Award".

Dell 
Vanderveldt was hired as the company’s first Entrepreneur in Residence in 2011 and by 2012 took the helm overseeing Dell’s global entrepreneurial initiatives.  Programs under her leadership include: The Dell Center for Entrepreneurs, The Dell Founders Club, and "The $100M Dell Innovators Credit Fund". As the Entrepreneur in Residence, she travels to over 80 cities each year to speak at conferences and panels to promote the global and domestic entrepreneurial initiatives at Dell.

The United Nations Foundation 
Vanderveldt joined the United Nations Foundation 2013-2014 Global Entrepreneur Council as one of 10 members to help foster change and innovation around the world. The UN Global Entrepreneur Council features entrepreneurs under the age of 45, spanning the corporate, creative, and media industries.

Policy 
In 2012, Vanderveldt helped architect the first federal and State based Entrepreneur in Residence Bill in Washington DC, aimed to simplify small business regulatory hurdles to help business owners start and grow their companies.

In 2013, Vanderveldt testified to pass the Entrepreneur-In-Residence bill SB 328 at the Texas Senate Government Organization Committee at the State Capitol in Austin, TX.

EBW2020 
Vanderveldt’s life goal and mission is to “Empower a Billion Women by 2020.” She strives to guide motivated women to success and help make their visions a reality by providing the tools, technology & resources to help them succeed. She gave a TedXWomen talk in 2011 on "Making the Impossible Possible" speaking about her mission and upbringing.

Her philanthropic efforts focus on women’s leadership, development and entrepreneurial initiatives in developing countries. Starting with Haiti, she supported the Goldman Sachs 10,000 Women Haitian Global Cohort, in partnership with Thunderbird School for Good and The US State Department, providing grants and computers (provided by Dell) to 27 women entrepreneurs in Haiti.

Awards and honors 
 2013 40 Women to Watch Over 40
 2013 Small Business Influencer Awards Honorable Mention
 2001 Austin - 40 Under 40 Award for Technology 
 Austin American Statesman's named Vanderveldt one of  "The Top 10 Tech Town's Rising Stars to Watch"
 Founded CNBC's first reality TV show, "American Made"
 2012 Alumni of the year - The Savannah College of Art & Design 
 2011 TEDxFiDiWomen Talk on "Making the Impossible Possible" 
 Vanderveldt has spoken at The UN Foundation Social Good Summit, Clinton Global Initiative, and SXSW

Personal life 
On September 22, 2009 she married former professional skydiver Glenn Hodgson, who is now the Executive Director of Ingrid Vanderveldt LLC, managing day-to-day operations and investments for the company.

References 

1970 births
Living people
21st-century American businesspeople
American media personalities
Savannah College of Art and Design alumni
McCombs School of Business alumni
People from Bethesda, Maryland
American women chief executives
21st-century American businesswomen